The Amu Darya Pipeline Bridge is a suspension bridge on the Amu Darya river. It is primarily a pipeline bridge but can also carry one lane of traffic. The bridge connects the Xorazm Region of Uzbekistan to the Lebap Region of Turkmenistan.

External links
 

Bridges built in the Soviet Union
Suspension bridges in Turkmenistan
Suspension bridges in Uzbekistan
Bridges completed in 1964